Mehdi Jeannin (born 20 April 1991) is a professional footballer who plays as a goalkeeper for FC Sochaux-Montbéliard. Born in France, he has elected to represent Algeria at international level.

Club career
After making his debut in the French lower divisions, Jeannin joined Clermont Foot in 2011, as a backup for Jessy Moulin and Fabien Farnolle. He made his full professional debut three years later in a 2–0 Ligue 2 defeat against Brest.

International career
In September 2015, Jeannin was called up to the Algeria national team for the first time for a pair of friendlies against Guinea and Senegal.

References

External links
 
 
 Mehdi Jeannin foot-national.com Profile

1991 births
Living people
Sportspeople from Besançon
Association football goalkeepers
Algerian footballers
French footballers
Clermont Foot players
FC Sochaux-Montbéliard players
Ligue 2 players
French sportspeople of Algerian descent
Footballers from Bourgogne-Franche-Comté